Extra Strong Mints is a brand name of mints produced in the United Kingdom

History
The brand was first made in 1935. Trebor was sold to Cadbury in 1989.

Promotion
In March 1988, the brand gave a £250,000 sponsorship to the England national football team, over three years.

In April 2015, a new series of adverts for the mints (the first in over ten years) was produced by Wieden+Kennedy London.

Production
They are produced in the north of Sheffield by Trebor, part of Cadbury. Trebor makes around 35 million packs a year at Sheffield.

References

External links
 Trebor story

Breath mints
British confectionery
Cadbury brands
Economy of Sheffield
History of Sheffield
Products introduced in 1935